The 2019 IIHF U18 World Championship was the 21st such event hosted by the International Ice Hockey Federation. Teams participated at several levels of competition. The competition also served as qualifications for the 2020 competition. One national team, Luxembourg, returned to play in the World Championships for the first time since playing in the 2000 European qualification tiers.

Sweden won the title on home ice. It was the nation's first U18 World Championship. Defending champion Finland finished in seventh place and without a medal for the first time since 2014.

Top Division

Match officials
12 referees and 10 linesmen were selected for the tournament.

Referees
 Aaro Brännare
 Michael Campbell
 Oldřich Hejduk
 Joonas Kova
 Guillaume Labonté
 Marcus Linde
 Sean MacFarlane
 Sergey Morozov
 Andre Schrader
 Andrei Shrubok
 Miroslav Štefík
 Michael Tscherrig

Linesmen
 Pavel Badyl
 Riley Bowles
 Henrik Haurum
 Jon Kilian
 Ludvig Lundgren
 David Obwegeser
 Jani Pesonen
 Nikita Shalagin
 Josef Špůr
 Tarrington Wyonzek

Preliminary round
All times are local (UTC+2).

Group A

Group B

Relegation round

Playoff round

Bracket

Quarterfinals

Semifinals

Bronze medal game

Final

Final standings

Statistics

Scoring leaders
List shows the top ten skaters sorted by points, then goals.

 GP = Games played; G = Goals; A = Assists; Pts = Points; +/− = Plus–minus; PIM = Penalties In MinutesSource: IIHF.com

Leading goaltenders
Only the top five goaltenders, based on save percentage, who have played 40% of their team's minutes are included in this list.

 TOI = Time On Ice (minutes:seconds); SA = Shots against; GA = Goals against; GAA = Goals against average; Sv% = Save percentage; SO = ShutoutsSource: IIHF.com

Awards
Best players selected by the Directorate:
Best Goaltender:  Yaroslav Askarov
Best Defenceman:  Philip Broberg
Best Forward:  Cole Caufield
Source: IIHF

Media All-Stars:
MVP:  Cole Caufield
Goaltender:  Yaroslav Askarov
Defencemen:  Philip Broberg /  Cameron York
Forwards:  Cole Caufield /  Jack Hughes /  Rodion Amirov
Source: IIHF

Division I

Group A
The Group A tournament was held in Grenoble, France from 14 to 20 April 2019.

Group B
The Group B tournament  was held in Székesfehérvár, Hungary from 14 to 20 April 2019.

Division II

Group A
The Group A tournament was held in Elektrėnai, Lithuania from 7 to 13 April 2019.

Group B
The Group B tournament was held in Belgrade, Serbia from 25 to 31 March 2019.

Division III

Group A
The Group A tournament was held in Sofia, Bulgaria from 25 to 31 March 2019.  At the time of the tournament Iceland was awarded second place, this was corrected on April 3.

Group B
The Group B tournament was held in Cape Town, South Africa from 9 to 12 April 2019.

References

External links
Official website

 
IIHF World U18 Championships
IIHF World U18 Championships
2019
2018–19 in Swedish ice hockey
Sports competitions in Umeå
Sports competitions in Örnsköldsvik
IIHF World U18 Championships